Maesteg (Neath Road) railway station served the town of Maesteg, Glamorgan, Wales from 1898 to 1964 on the Llynvi and Ogmore Railway.

History 
The station opened as Maesteg on 14 February 1898 by the Port Talbot Railway. Its name was changed to Maesteg Neath Road on 1 July 1924. It closed to passengers on 11 September 1933 and closed completely in 1964.

References

External links 

Disused railway stations in Bridgend County Borough
Former Great Western Railway stations
Railway stations in Great Britain opened in 1897
Railway stations in Great Britain closed in 1933
1897 establishments in Wales
1964 disestablishments in Wales